2,6-Diacetylpyridine is an organic compound with the formula C5H3N(C(O)CH3)2. It is a white solid that is soluble in organic solvents.  It is a disubstituted pyridine.  It is a precursor to ligands in coordination chemistry.

Synthesis
The synthesis of 2,6-diacetylpyridine begins with oxidation of the methyl groups in 2,6-lutidine to form dipicolinic acid.  This process has been well established with potassium permanganate and selenium dioxide.  The diketone can be formed from the diester of picolinic acid groups through a Claisen condensation.  The resulting adduct can be decarboxylated to give diacetylpyridine.

Treating 2,6-pyridinedicarbonitrile with methylmagnesium bromide provides an alternative synthesis for the diketone.

Precursor to Schiff base ligands
Diacetylpyridine is a popular starting material for ligands in coordination chemistry, often via template reactions.  The diiminopyridine (DIP) class of ligands can be formed from diacetylpyridine through Schiff base condensation with substituted anilines.  Diiminopyridine ligands have been the focus of much interest due to their ability to traverse a wide range of oxidation states.

In azamacrocycle chemistry, diacetylpyridines can undergo the same Schiff base condensation with N1-(3-aminopropyl)propane-1,3-diamines.  The product of the condensation can be hydrogenated to yield macrocyclic tetradentate ligands.  Similar penta- and hexadentate ligands have been synthesized by varying the polyamine chain.

See also
2,6-Diformylpyridine

References

Pyridines
Ligands